The Dutch Senior Masters is a men's professional golf tournament for players aged 50 and above which is part of the European Senior Tour. It was first held in October 2017 at The Dutch, Spijk, Netherlands. It was the first European Senior Tour event to be held in the Netherlands since the 2014 Dutch Senior Open.

Winners

References

External links
Coverage on the European Senior Tour's official site

Former European Senior Tour events
Golf tournaments in the Netherlands
Recurring sporting events established in 2017